Stepanivka, sometimes transcribed as Stepanovka, in Ukraine, is the site of an ancient settlement dating to 5000 - 4300 B.C. belonging to the Cucuteni-Trypillian culture. The settlement was for the time large, covering an area of 15 hectares. This proto-city are just one of 2440 Cucuteni-Trypillia settlements discovered so far in Moldova and Ukraine. 194 (8%) of these settlements had an area of more than 10 hectares between 5000 - 2700 B.C. and more than 29 settlements had an area in the range 100 - 300 - 450 Hectares.

The site is near the (modern village) Stepanivka (Perevalskyi Raion) in Luhansk Oblast. On 28 July 2014, Ukrainian forces reportedly secured this village from pro-Russian separatists. Starting in mid-April 2014, pro-Russian separatists captured several towns in Luhansk Oblast. On 14 August 2014 the Ukrainian military lost control of Stepanivka to the Luhansk People's Republic. According to a soldier of the Ukrainian 8th Army Corps the Luhansk People's Republic were able to do this assisted by armored units of the Russian Armed Forces.

See also
 Cucuteni-Trypillian culture
 Danube Valley cultures

References

Cucuteni–Trypillia culture